Bruno Ganz (22 March 1941 – 16 February 2019) was a Swiss actor whose career in German stage, television and film productions spanned nearly 60 years. He was known for his collaborations with the directors Werner Herzog, Éric Rohmer, Francis Ford Coppola, and Wim Wenders, earning widespread recognition with his roles as Jonathan Zimmerman in The American Friend (1977), Jonathan Harker in Nosferatu the Vampyre (1979) and Damiel the Angel in Wings of Desire (1987).

Ganz received renewed international acclaim for his portrayal of Adolf Hitler in the Oscar-nominated film Downfall (2004). He also had roles in several English-language films, including The Boys from Brazil (1978), Strapless (1989), Luther (2003), The Manchurian Candidate (2004), The Reader (2008), Unknown (2011), The Counselor (2013) and Remember (2015). On stage, Ganz portrayed Dr. Heinrich Faust in Peter Stein's staging of Faust, Part One and Faust, Part Two in 2000.

Early life
Ganz was born on 22 March 1941 in Zürich to a Swiss-German factory worker father and a northern Italian mother. He had decided to pursue an acting career by the time he entered university. He was equally drawn to stage and screen but initially enjoyed greater success on the stage.

Career

Stage career
Ganz made his theatrical debut in 1961 and devoted himself mainly to the stage for almost the next two decades.

The German magazine Theater heute solidified Ganz's reputation as a stage actor by pronouncing him Schauspieler des Jahres (Actor of the Year) in 1973. One of Ganz's most physically demanding stage portrayals was the title character in Peter Stein's 2000 production of Goethe's Faust (Parts I and II); he suffered injuries during rehearsals which delayed his starting in the role. He also served as a speaker in classical music works, including a 1993 recording of Luigi Nono's Il canto sospeso with the Berlin Philharmonic Orchestra.

Film career
In 1960 Ganz landed his first film role, in Der Herr mit der schwarzen Melone (The Man in the Black Derby). Despite the support of lead actor Gustav Knuth, Ganz's cinematic debut was not particularly successful and it was only many years later that his career in film got off the ground.

Ganz made his film breakthrough in a major part in the 1976 film , launching a widely recognized film career in Europe and the United States. He worked with several directors of the New German Cinema like Werner Herzog and Wim Wenders, and also with international directors like Éric Rohmer and Francis Ford Coppola, among others. In 1977, he co-starred with Dennis Hopper in Wenders' American Friend, an adaptation of Patricia Highsmith's novel Ripley's Game, playing a terminally ill father who gets hired as a professional killer. In 1979, he starred opposite Klaus Kinski in Herzog's Nosferatu: Phantom der Nacht (Nosferatu: Phantom of the Night). Ganz played a professor opposite Sir Laurence Olivier in the thriller The Boys from Brazil (1978), about Nazi fugitives.

In 1987 Ganz first played the role of the angel Damiel in Wim Wenders's Wings of Desire. He reprised the role in Faraway, So Close! in 1993. Ganz appeared in The Reader as a Holocaust survivor and as police officer Horst Herold in The Baader Meinhof Complex, which were both nominated for the 81st Academy Awards (Best Picture and Best Foreign Language Film respectively). In 2003, he portrayed Johann von Staupitz in Luther. In 2011, he appeared as a former Stasi operator opposite Liam Neeson in Unknown. Among Ganz's later roles were the grandfather in the literary adaptation Heidi (2015), a pseudo-scientific healer in Sally Potter's The Party (2017) and ancient Roman poet Virgil in Lars von Trier's The House that Jack Built (2018).

Ganz portrayed Adolf Hitler in Der Untergang (Downfall) (2004) after four months of researching the role. His performance was widely acclaimed by critics; The Guardian critic Rob Mackie described Ganz as "the most convincing screen Hitler yet: an old, bent, sick dictator with the shaking hands of someone with Parkinson's, alternating between rage and despair in his last days in the bunker". His performance has inspired many parodies on YouTube, using video and audio from the film with humorous subtitles.

Personal life and death
Ganz was married to Sabine from 1965 until his death, although they were separated for a long time; their son, Daniel, was born in 1972.

In February 2018, doctors in Salzburg found that Ganz was suffering from intestinal cancer, and he immediately began chemotherapy.

Ganz died on 16 February 2019 at his home in the village of Au, in Wädenswil, Switzerland, at the age of 77, a month shy of his 78th birthday. He was surrounded by his partner, the theatrical photographer Ruth Walz, and his son Daniel.

From 1996 until his death in 2019, Ganz held the Republic of Austria's Iffland-Ring, which passes from actor to actor—each bequeathing the ring to the next holder, judging that actor to be the "most significant and most worthy actor of the German-speaking theatre". Ganz was also honored with the Order of Merit of Germany and was made a knight of the French Légion d'honneur.

Awards and honors

1973: "Actor of the Year" in German magazine Theater heute

1991: Hans-Reinhart-Ring, given by the Swiss Society for Theatre Culture
1996: Iffland-Ring
1998: Officier of the Ordre des Arts et des Lettres (France)

2000: Swiss Film Prize

2000: David di Donatello Award for Bread and Tulips

2004: European Film Award

2005: Austrian Decoration for Science and Art

2006: Officer's Cross of the Order of Merit of the Federal Republic of Germany

2011: Pardo alla Carriera at Locarno International Film Festival
2012: Asteroid 199900 Brunoganz, discovered by Silvano Casulli in 2007, was named in his honor

2014: Lifetime Achievement Award, Goldene Kamera
2015: Special Golden Camera 300 for lifetime achievement, Manaki Brothers Film Festival

Filmography
Ganz appeared in the following films:

The Man in the Black Derby (1960), as Bellboy
 (1961)
Es Dach überem Chopf (1962), as Fred Weber
The Smooth Career (1967), as Barnhard Kral
 (Sommergäste, 1976), as Jakov Shalimov
Lumière (1976), as Heinrich Grün
The Marquise of O... (1976), as Der Graf
 (The Wild Duck, 1976), as Gregers
The American Friend (Der Amerikanische Freund, 1977), as Jonathan Zimmermann
Die linkshändige Frau (The Left-Handed Woman, 1978), as Bruno
The Boys from Brazil (1978), as Professor Bruckner
Schwarz und weiß wie Tage und Nächte (1978, TV Movie), as Thomas Rosemund
Messer im Kopf (Knife in the Head, 1978), as Dr. Berthold Hoffmann
Nosferatu: Phantom der Nacht (Nosferatu the Vampyre, 1979), as Jonathan Harker
Retour à la bien-aimée (Return to the Beloved, 1979), as Dr. Stephan Kern
Oggetti smarriti (Lost and Found / Lost Objects / An Italian Woman, 1980), as Werner
5% de risque (1980), as David
Polenta (1980), as Jules, the Narrator
Der Erfinder (The Inventor, 1980), as Jakob Nüssli
La provinciale (1980), as Remy
Etwas wird sichtbar (1981)
La Dame aux camélias (The Lady of the Camellias, 1981), as Count Perregaux
Ręce do góry (Hands Up!, 1981)
Die Fälschung (Circle of Deceit, 1981), as Georg Laschen
Logik des Gefühls (The Logic of Emotion, 1982)
Krieg und Frieden (War and Peace, 1982)
Dans la ville blanche (In the White City, 1983), as Paul
 (System ohne Schatten, 1983), as Faber
Killer aus Florida (Killer from Florida, 1983, Short)
De ijssalon (Private Resistance, 1985), as Gustav
El río de oro (1986), as Peter
Der Pendler (1986)
Väter und Söhne – Eine deutsche Tragödie (1986, TV Mini-Series), as Heinrich Beck
Der Himmel über Berlin (Wings of Desire, 1987), as Damiel
Un amore di donna (1988), as Franco Bassani
Von Zeit zu Zeit (1989), as Jumbo
Bankomatt (1989), as Bruno
Strapless (1989), as Raymond Forbes
The Legendary Life of Ernest Hemingway (1989), as Ezra Pound
Tassilo (1991, TV Series), as Tassilo
Erfolg (Success, 1991), as Jacques Tüverlin
Children of Nature (1991), as Engill
La Domenica specialmente (Especially on Sunday, 1991), as Vittorio (segment "La domenica specialmente")
Prague (1992), as Josef
Brandnacht (Night on Fire, 1992), as Peter Keller
L'Absence (The Absence, 1992), as Player
The Last Days of Chez Nous (1992), as J.P.
In weiter Ferne, so nah! (Faraway, So Close!, 1993), as Damiel
Heller Tag (1994), as Georg
Diario senza date (1995)
Tödliches Schweigen (Deadly Silence, 1996, TV Movie), as Hans Plache
Saint-Ex (1997), as Antoine de Saint-Exupéry
 (Daybreak, 1998, TV Movie), as Fehleisen
Mia aioniotita kai mia mera (Eternity and a Day, 1998), as Alexandros
You Can't Go Home Again (1999), as Narrator (voice)
WerAngstWolf (2000)
Pane e Tulipani (Bread and Tulips, 2000), as Fernando Girasole
Johann Wolfgang von Goethe: Faust (2001, TV Movie), as Faust
La forza del passato (The Power of the Past, 2002), as Bogliasco
 (Epstein's Night, 2002), as Adam Rose
Behind Me (2002), as Himself
Luther (2003), as Johann von Staupitz
The Manchurian Candidate (2004), as Delp
Der Untergang (Downfall, 2004), as Adolf Hitler
Have No Fear: The Life of Pope John Paul II (2005, TV Movie), as Cardinal Stefan Wyszynski
Vitus (2006), as Grandfather
Baruto no Gakuen (バルトの楽園; Ode an die Freude, 2006), as Kurt Heinrich
Youth Without Youth (2007), as Prof. Roman Stanciulescu
Stairway to Nowhere (2008), as Brot Darsteller
Der Baader Meinhof Komplex (The Baader Meinhof Complex, 2008), as Horst Herold
Η Σκόνη του Χρόνου (The Dust of Time, 2008), as Jacob
The Reader (2008), as Professor Rohl
Giulias Verschwinden (2009), as John
Der grosse Kater (2010), as Kater
Taxiphone: El Mektoub (2010)
 (Colors in the Dark, 2010), as Fred
Das Ende ist mein Anfang (The End Is My Beginning, 2010), as Tiziano Terzani
Unknown (2011), as Ernst Jürgen
Sport de filles (2011), as Franz Mann
Night Train to Lisbon (2013), as Older Jorge O'Kelly
Age of Uprising: The Legend of Michael Kohlhaas (2013), as The Governor
The Counselor (2013), as the Diamond Dealer
In Order of Disappearance (2014), as Papa
Amnesia (2015), as Bruno, Jo's grandfather
Remember (2015), as Rudy Kurlander #1
Heidi (2015), as Alpöhi, Heidi's grandfather
Un Juif pour l'exemple (2016), as Arthur Bloch
The Party (2017), as Gottfried
In Times of Fading Light (2017), as Wilhelm Powileit
Fortuna (2018), as Brother Jean
The House That Jack Built (2018), as Verge
 (2018), as Sigmund Freud
The Witness (2018), as Nikola Radin
A Hidden Life (2019), as Judge Lueben
Winter Journey (2019), as Gunther Goldschmidt (final film role)

Notes

References

External links 

theartsdesk Q&A: Bruno Ganz on Playing Hitler (5 December 2010)

1941 births
2019 deaths
20th-century Swiss male actors
21st-century Swiss male actors
Adolf Hitler
Burials in Switzerland
Chevaliers of the Légion d'honneur
Chevaliers of the Ordre des Arts et des Lettres
David di Donatello winners
Deaths from cancer in Switzerland
Deaths from colorectal cancer
European Film Awards winners (people)
German Film Award winners
Iffland-Ring
Male actors from Zürich
Officers Crosses of the Order of Merit of the Federal Republic of Germany
Recipients of the Austrian Decoration for Science and Art
Swiss male film actors
Swiss male stage actors
Swiss male television actors
Swiss people of Italian descent
Zurich University of the Arts alumni
Ciak d'oro winners